Where the Ragged People Go is the first album by the Norwegian band Shining. It was released in 2001 on BP Productions.

The album title, "Where the Ragged People Go", is a line from the song The Boxer by Simon & Garfunkel.

Track listing
All tracks are composed by Jørgen Munkeby.

Personnel
Jørgen Munkeby - saxophone, flute, clarinet
Aslak Hartberg - acoustic bass
Torstein Lofthus - drums
Morten Qvenild - piano

References

External links
 Last.fm album page
 

Shining (Norwegian band) albums
2001 albums